Gveleti, is a village (aul) in the Kazbegi Municipality of Georgia. It is located in the Darial Gorge, on the right bank of the Devdaraki (a left tributary of the Terek river), 1560 meters above sea level, 9 kilometers from Stepantsminda. Gelatē was founded by the Ingush taïp Gelatkhoy.

History

The first mention of Gveleti occurred in the document «Gergetis sulta matiane» dating to the XV century. In Russian documents the village is first mentioned in 1589 in the Ambassadorial Orders under the name "Cherebashev kabak" (settlement), named after the elder of the Ingush village — Cherbash. During the passage of the Russian embassy led by S. Zvenigorodsky and T. Antonov through the territory of the Ingush to Georgia in September 1589, the rains washed away the last bridge across the river on the border with Georgia, and the embassy was forced to ask for help from local residents. They were in need of wood to repair the bridge as was documented: “the ambassadors, Prince Semyon and Deacon Torkh, at the Cherebashov kabak, spend a day for the bridge”.

The Cherebashev settlement was located on the site of the Ingush village of Gvileti in the Darial Gorge. According to Ingush historical legends, the ancestors of the Cherbizhev's (Чербижевы) lived along the areas of the Georgian Military Road. In one of these legends, written down by B.K. Dalgat, it is said that Cherbizh (Чербыш) and the inhabitants of Gvileti managed to defeat the army of the Kabardian knyaz, who was marching on Tiflis. In gratitude for this, the Georgian king George presented Cherbizh with land from Kazbeki to Gvileti.

Geography

References 

 Villages in Mtskheta-Mtianeti